Tracks is a monthly Australian surf magazine, promoting itself as "the surfers' bible." It is published by Nextmedia.

Tracks was established in October 1970 by Alby Falzon, John Witzig, and David Elfick, starting as a kind of counterculture tabloid, printed on newsprint and produced on Sydney's northern beaches. Since then it has grown to be a major surfing publication.

History 
Tracks was originally published by the Tracks Publishing Company.

Tracks published a cartoon series,"Captain Goodvibes", by Australian cartoonist Tony Edwards. The Captain Goodvibes cartoons were first published in May 1973 and appeared regularly until July 1981. The character became an icon of Australian surfing culture.

"Lash Clone" by Australian Author D. C. Greening appeared in the pages of Tracks during the 1980s, with Greening's later works, "Cosmic Surf Wars," appearing more recently.

Some time after 1987 the magazine was acquired by Next Publishing (now known as Nextmedia).

In July 1988 the magazine's title was updated from tracks to tRACKS.

In March 2000 the magazine changed format from the original newsprint size down to a tabloid size.

Tracks editors 
 Alby Falzon 1970-1975
 John Witzig 1970-1972
 David Elfick 1970
 Phil Jarratt 1975-1977
 Paul Holmes 1978-1981
 Kirk Wilcox 1981-1984
 Nick Carroll 1984-1986
 Jon Ellis 1986-1988
 Tim Baker 1989-1991
 Gary Dunne 1991-1994
 Neil Ridgeway 1994-1997
 Wayne Dart 1997-2000
 Sean Doherty 2000-2008
 Luke Kennedy 2008-

Controversy 
In 2014, 13-year-old reader and surfer Olive Bowers wrote an open letter to the magazine pointing out sexism in the print and digital editions of the magazine. She pointed to the absence of female surfers and the presence of scantily-clad women not involved in surfing in the magazine.

References

External links

Magazines established in 1970
1970 establishments in Australia
Monthly magazines published in Australia
Surfing magazines
Companies based on the Gold Coast, Queensland
Sports magazines published in Australia
Mass media on the Gold Coast, Queensland